Shriners International, formally known as the Ancient Arabic Order of the Nobles of the Mystic Shrine (AAONMS), is an American Masonic society established in 1870 and is headquartered in Tampa, Florida.

Shriners International describes itself as a fraternity based on fun, fellowship, and the Masonic principles of brotherly love, relief, and truth. There are about 200 temples across North America, South America, Europe and Southeast Asia. The organization founded the Shriners Hospitals for Children.

The organization was previously known as "Shriners North America". The name was changed in 2010 across North America, Central America, South America, Europe, and Southeast Asia.

History
In 1870, there were several thousand Freemasons in Manhattan, many of whom lunched at the Knickerbocker Cottage at a special table on the second floor. There, the idea of a new fraternity for Masons, stressing fun and fellowship, was discussed. Together, Walter M. Fleming and William J. Florence established a separate fellowship to fulfill those ideals.

While on tour in Marseille, Florence, an actor, was invited to a party given by an Arab diplomat. The entertainment was a musical comedy. At its conclusion, the guests became members of a secret society. Florence took notes and drawings at his initial viewing and on two other occasions, once in Algiers and once in Cairo. When he returned to New York in 1870, he showed his material to Fleming.

Fleming created the ritual, emblem and costumes. Florence and Fleming were initiated August 13, 1870, and they initiated 11 men on June 16, 1871.

The group adopted a Middle Eastern theme and soon established Temple, although the term Temple has now been replaced by Shrine Auditorium or Shrine Center. The first Temple established was Mecca Temple, established at the New York City Masonic Hall on September 26, 1872. Fleming was the first potentate.

In 1875, there were 43 Shriners in the organization. To encourage membership, the Imperial Grand Council of the Ancient Order of the Nobles of the Mystic Shrine for North America was created at the June 6, 1876 meeting of Mecca Temple. Fleming was elected the first imperial potentate. By 1878, there were 425 members in 13 temples in eight states, and by 1888, there were 7,210 members in 48 temples in the United States and Canada. By the Imperial Session held in Washington, D.C. in 1900, there were 55,000 members and 82 Temples.

By 1938 there were about 340,000 members in the United States. That year, Life published photographs of the Shriners' rites. It described the Shriners as being the first in prestige, wealth and show among secret societies, and that Shriners organizations typically include a town's most prominent citizens.

In 2010, Shriners removed much of the Middle Eastern theming.

Membership
Historically, a Mason had to complete either the Scottish Rite or York Rite systems to be eligible for membership in the Shrine.

In 1991, brick-mason Michael G. Vaughan filed a lawsuit against the Oleika Shrine Temple in Lexington, Kentucky, for hazing practices to which he said he was subjected in his efforts to become a Shriner. In court, Vaughan told jurors that in June 1989, he was blindfolded and received a jolt of electricity that was applied to his bare buttocks as part of the Shriners' initiation rites. He said he was forced to walk on an electric mat that was meant to simulate the hot sands of the Sahara, and that he was knocked unconscious and received other injuries during his initiation.

Vaughan said the initiation left him humiliated and embarrassed, and caused him to suffer anxiety, nightmares, and a sleep disorder. After two hours of deliberation, the jury rejected the claim.

Women's auxiliaries

There are two organizations tied to the Shrine that are for women only: The Ladies' Oriental Shrine and the Daughters of the Nile. They both support the Shriners Hospitals and promote sociability, and membership in either organization is open to any woman 18 years of age and older who is related to a Shriner or Master Mason by birth or marriage.

The Ladies Oriental Shrine of North America was founded in 1903 in Wheeling, West Virginia, and the Daughters of the Nile was founded in 1913 in Seattle, Washington. The latter organization has local branches called "Temples", and there were ten of these in 1922. Among the famous members of the Daughters of the Nile was First Lady Florence Harding, wife of Warren G. Harding.

Black shrines 
In 1893, a black counterpart to the Shriners movement was initiated by John G. Jones and other Prince Hall masons, initially called The Ancient Egyptian Arabic Order Nobles Mystic Shrine of North and South America and Its Jurisdictions. Early in the group's history, there was legal conflict between the white and black orders, with a white order from Texas filing suit against a local black order for infringement of white Shriners regalia and traditions. The white order was initially successful in quashing the black temple until the ruling was overturned in appeals in 1929, protecting the right of black Shriners to continue practicing and fundraising nationwide. The Worldwide Fraternal Shrine Family counts 35,000 members in 227 shrines, with its own women's auxiliary organizations. Their primary recipients of charitable donations are the NAACP, The Urban League, the UNCF, and various hospitals and universities.

Architecture
Some of the earliest Shrine Centers often chose a Moorish Revival style for their Temples. Architecturally notable Shriners Temples include: the Shrine Auditorium in Los Angeles; the former Mecca Temple, now called New York City Center and used primarily as a concert hall; Newark Symphony Hall; the Landmark Theater (formerly The Mosque) in Richmond, Virginia; the Tripoli Shrine Temple in Milwaukee, Wisconsin; the Polly Rosenbaum Building (formerly the El Zaribah Shrine Auditorium) in Phoenix; the Helena Civic Center (Montana) (formerly the Algeria Shrine Temple); Abou Ben Adhem Shrine Mosque in Springfield, Missouri; Murat Shrine Temple (now Old National Center) in Indianapolis; the Fox Theatre (Atlanta, Georgia) which was jointly built between the Atlanta Shriners and movie mogul William Fox; and the Syria Mosque, Pittsburgh, Pennsylvania.

Philanthropy

Shriners Hospitals for Children

The Shrine's charitable arm is the Shriners Hospitals for Children, a network of 22 healthcare facilities in the United States, Mexico, and Canada.

In June 1920, the Imperial Council Session voted to establish a Shriners Hospital for Crippled Children to treat orthopedic injuries and conditions, diseases, burns, spinal cord injuries, and birth defects, such as cleft lip and palate, in children. The first hospital opened in 1922 in Shreveport, Louisiana. By the end of the decade 13 more hospitals were operational.

Any child under the age of 18 can be admitted to the hospital if a doctor determines the child can be treated. There is no requirement for religion, race or relationship to a Shriner.

Until June 2012, all care at Shriners Hospitals was provided without charge to patients and their families. At that time, because the size of their endowment had decreased due to losses in the stock market, Shriners Hospitals started billing patients' insurance companies, but continued to offer free care to children without insurance. Shriners hospitals waive all costs insurance does not cover. Shriners Hospitals for Children is a 501(c)(3) nonprofit organization.

Shriners Hospitals for Children can be found in these cities:

 Boston, MA
 Chicago, IL
 Dayton, OH
 Erie, PA*
 Galveston, TX
 Greenville, SC
 Honolulu, HI
 Houston, TX
 Lexington, KY*
 Mexico City, MEX
 Minneapolis, MN
 Montreal, Quebec
 Pasadena, CA*
 Philadelphia, PA
 Portland, OR
 Sacramento, CA
 Salt Lake City, UT
 Shreveport, LA
 Spokane, WA
 Springfield, MA
 St. Louis, MO

*This location is an outpatient, ambulatory care center.

Events

Shriners host the annual East-West Shrine Game, a college football all-star game.

The Shriners originally hosted a golf tournament in association with singer/actor Justin Timberlake, called the Justin Timberlake Shriners Hospitals for Children Open, a PGA Tour golf tournament played in Las Vegas, Nevada. The relationship between Timberlake and the Shriners ended in 2012, when the Shriners reported that Timberlake was interested in being involved with the organization only when television cameras were present. In July 2012, the PGA Tour and Shriners Hospitals for Children announced a five-year title sponsorship extension, carrying the commitment to the Shriners Hospitals for Children Open through 2017. The name was changed to The Shriners Hospitals for Children Open and is played in Las Vegas, Nevada.

Once a year, the fraternity meets for the Imperial Council Session in a major North American city.

Many Shrine Centers also hold a yearly Shrine Circus as a fundraiser.

Controversy

In 2008, an investigative committee established by the joint boards of the Shriners of North America fraternal organization and the Shriners Hospitals for Children found that Ralph Semb, chairman of the Shriners Hospitals Board of Trustees, had unilaterally tried to fire fund-raising executive, Edgar McGonigal, after McGonigal declined to hire a direct-mail company with ties to a company owned by the son of a close friend of another board member, Gene Bracewell, who is also the imperial treasurer of the fraternal organization.

McGonigal said he did not hire the company because of its ties to a financial company that had performed poorly in previous dealings.

The committee found that Semb and Bracewell had violated the organizations’ conflict of interest policy and their ethics code and recommended that Semb and Bracewell be reprimanded.

The report included accusations of financial improprieties within the organization, including not reporting benefits Shriners leaders received as income and knowingly filing incorrect tax forms for the hospitals. Other Shriners came forward with additional complaints, including the mixing of charitable and noncharitable assets and the disappearance of money raised for the hospitals.

See also 

 Masonic bodies
 Military Order of the Cootie
 Order of Quetzalcoatl
 Royal Order of Jesters
 Iowa Corn Song
 "Shriner's Convention", country-and-western novelty song

References

External links 

 Shriners International – Official homepage
 Shriners Hospitals for Children –  Official Homepage

 
Masonic organizations
Organizations based in Florida
Organizations established in 1870
1870 establishments in New York (state)
Clubs and societies in Canada